Vango may refer to:
 Alf Vango, an English footballer
 Vango (company), a manufacturer of camping equipment
 Vango Adventure Farm, in Norfolk County, Ontario, Canada
 Vangos, a village in Greece
 Vango, a 2010 book written by Timothée de Fombelle

See also
 VangoBooks, a publisher of textbooks, see Pearson Education#Imprints.